Lake Beulah may refer to:

Lake Beulah (Florida), a lake in Florida
Lake Beulah (Mississippi), a lake in Mississippi
Lake Beulah, Wisconsin, an unincorporated community